Žut is an uninhabited island in the Croatian part of the Adriatic Sea, in central Dalmatia. With an area of  it is the 28th largest island in Croatia and the second largest island in the Kornati archipelago, after Kornat. Although most of the archipelago, composed of 89 islands, islets and rocks, is included in the Kornati National Park, the island of Žut is not.

Due to centuries of slash-and-burn practices, Žut is almost barren of maquis shrubland, otherwise common in most Adriatic islands. There is no farmland on the island, and it never had any permanent settlements. Today, there is a 135-berth marina on the island, with a restaurant and a grocery store, operated by ACI Club and open from April to October.

In historical sources, the island has been referred to as Xut, Iunctus, Zuth and Zunchio. Although the island's name might suggest it (Žut is "yellow" in Croatian), it is not Slavic in origin, being derived from Latin junctus ("adjacent", "close"), which refers either to the island's closeness to Kornat, or its former status as a part of private property on Kornat.

According to measurements done in the early 2000s, Žut is also the largest uninhabited island in Croatia, being almost  larger than Prvić near Krk, which had previously been thought to hold this distinction.


See also
Kornati
Sit (island)
List of islands of Croatia

References

Sources

External links

Kornati Islands
Islands of Croatia
Islands of the Adriatic Sea
Uninhabited islands of Croatia
Landforms of Šibenik-Knin County